The Traversay Islands are a group of three islands—Zavodovski, Leskov and Visokoi—at the northern end of the South Sandwich Islands.

History
The group was discovered in November 1819 by a Russian expedition under Bellingshausen, who named them for Jean-Baptiste Prevost de Sansac, Marquis de Traversay (1754–1831), a French naval officer who joined the Russian navy in 1791, at the request of an émigré Frenchman in Russian service, admiral Nassau-Siegen. He was Minister of Naval Affairs at Saint Petersburg, 1809–28, and chief promoter of Bellingshausen's Antarctic voyage. The name was previously transliterated as Traverse because it was incorrectly thought that the man commemorated was a Russian.

Geography

It is the northernmost of the South Sandwich Islands and the nearest to South Georgia. The stratovolcano Mount Asphyxia dominates the western side of the island while the eastern half is a low-lying lava plain.

Mount Asphyxia is believed to be active with fresh lava reported in 1830 and numerous indications of activity since. Approximately 50% of the island is composed of tephra. The island is home to around two million breeding chinstrap penguins, making it one of the world's largest penguin colonies. Zavodovski Island featured in the initial part of BBC’s Planet Earth II natural history television series, narrated by David Attenborough and first shown in the UK on 6 November 2016.  The programme described in film life in the harsh environment for the 1.5 million Chinstrap penguins – the largest penguin colony in the world.

The peak is named after Sir Arnold Weinholt Hodson, a governor of the Falkland Islands. Visokoi means "high". The island's eastern tip, Point Irving, is named for the leader of a British exploratory and mapping expedition, Commander John J. Irving; the father of British writer and Holocaust denier, David Irving.

It was named by Bellingshausen after the third lieutenant on the expedition ship Vostok. It is composed of andesitic rather than basaltic lava. The subduction zone forming the South Sandwich Trench lies to the east of the island arc.

See also
 List of Antarctic and sub-Antarctic islands
 List of Antarctic islands north of 60° S

References

External links
Photograph of Zavodovski Island
Aerial photograph of Zavodovski Island This image belongs to John Smellie, Leicester University
Photograph of Visokoi Island

Islands of the South Sandwich Islands
Volcanoes of the Atlantic Ocean
Volcanoes of South Georgia and the South Sandwich Islands